Oliver Jack Pendlebury (born 19 January 2002) is an English professional footballer who plays as a midfielder for National League club Aldershot Town.

After playing youth football for Marlow and Reading, he made his senior debut for Reading in the FA Cup in January 2021. He was released by Reading at the end of the season and signed for EFL League One club Wycombe Wanderers. After a season at the club and a loan spell at Woking, he was released the following year. Following his release from Wycombe, Pendlebury joined Farnborough in September 2022.

Early life and education
Born in Maidenhead, Pendlebury attended Altwood Church of England School in Maidenhead.

Club career

Early career
Having played youth football for Marlow before joining Reading's academy, he signed his first professional contract with Reading in January 2019. He was named in the starting line-up for his senior debut in an FA Cup third round tie with Luton Town on 9 January 2021, where Reading lost 1–0. On 11 May 2021, Reading announced that Pendlebury was one of their players being released by the club at the end of the 2020–21 season when their contract expired.

Wycombe Wanderers
On 8 June 2021, EFL League One club Wycombe Wanderers announced that Pendlebury would sign for them on 1 July 2021, once his Reading contract had expired. He made his debut for the club in their opening match of the season against Accrington Stanley on 7 August 2021 with fellow midfielders Dominic Gape, Curtis Thompson and David Wheeler unavailable; Wycombe won 2–1 with manager Gareth Ainsworth stating that after the game that he is "not afraid in giving young kids their debuts" in response to Pendlebury's performance. He scored the first goals of his career the following week when he scored a second-half brace in a 3–1 win over Cheltenham Town. On 4 March 2022, Pendlebury joined National League side, Woking on loan for the remainder of the 2021–22 campaign. He went onto feature four times for the Cards before being recalled by his parent club a month later. He was released by Wycombe at the end of the season.

Farnborough
On 3 September 2022, Pendlebury joined National League South club Farnborough on a short-term deal. That same day he made his debut during a 1–0 victory over Cheshunt.

Aldershot Town
In January 2023, Pendlebury signed for National League club Aldershot Town on a deal until the end of the season.

International career
He captained England at under-16 level.

Career statistics

References

External links

2002 births
Living people
English footballers
People from Maidenhead
Footballers from Berkshire
Association football midfielders
Marlow F.C. players
Reading F.C. players
Wycombe Wanderers F.C. players
Woking F.C. players
Farnborough F.C. players
Aldershot Town F.C. players
English Football League players
National League (English football) players
England youth international footballers